Marsabit Airport is an airport in Marsabit, Kenya.

Location
Marsabit Airport  is located in, Marsabit County, in the town of Marsabit, in the northern Kenyan desert, near the International border with Ethiopia.

The geographic coordinates of this airport are:2° 20' 42.00"N, 38° 0' 0.00"E (Latitude:2.345000; Longitude:38.000000).

Overview
Marsabit Airport is a small civilian airport, serving Marsabit and surrounding communities.

Airlines and destinations

See also
 Marsabit
 Mount Marsabit
 Eastern Province (Kenya)
 Kenya Airports Authority
 Kenya Civil Aviation Authority

References

External links
  Location of Marsabit Airport at Google Maps
 Website of Kenya Airports Authority
 

Airports in Kenya
Eastern Province (Kenya)
Marsabit County